|}

The Britannia Stakes is a flat handicap horse race in Great Britain open to three-year-old colts and geldings. It is run at Ascot over a distance of 1 mile (1,609 metres) on the straight course, and it is scheduled to take place each year in June on the third day of the Royal Ascot meeting.

The Britannia Stakes was first run in 1928 and takes place over the same course and distance as the Royal Hunt Cup.

Winners since 1988

See also
 Horse racing in Great Britain
 List of British flat horse races

References

 Paris-Turf:
Racing Post:

Ascot Racecourse
Flat races in Great Britain
Open mile category horse races
Recurring sporting events established in 1928
1928 establishments in England